Moma is a genus of owlet moths in the subfamily Dyopsinae. The genus was erected by Jacob Hübner in 1820

Description
Their eyes are hairy. The proboscis is well developed. Palpi obliquely upturned and clothed with long hair below, and short third joint. Thorax and abdomen tuftless, where abdomen clothed with long hair at sides. Larva forms a cocoon in a rolled up leaf.

Species
 Moma abbreviata (Sugi, 1968)
 Moma alpium (Osbeck, 1778)
 Moma fulvicollis (de Lattin, 1949)
 Moma glauca Turati, 1911
 Moma tsushimana Sugi, 1982

References

Pantheinae